Pars ascendens may refer to:

 Ascending aorta, also known by the Latin term pars ascendens aortae
 Ascending limb of loop of Henle, also known by the Latin term pars ascendens ansa nephrica